Jessica Mayho (born 14 June 1993) is an English track and field athlete specialising in the hammer throw.

She became a double British champion when she successfully defended her title by winning the hammer throw event at the 2020 British Athletics Championships with a throw of 65.47 metres.

References

Living people
1993 births
English female hammer throwers
British female hammer throwers
British Athletics Championships winners